Protected areas of Panama include:

 Arraiján Protected Forest (Bosque Protector de Arraiján)
 Boca Vieja Beach Wildlife Refuge (Refugio de Vida Silvestre Playa Boca Vieja)
 Calobre Springs Natural Monument (Monumento Natural de Los Pozos de Colobre) in Calobre District
 Cerro Ancón Reserve (Reserva Cerro Ancón) 
 Colón Island Natural Reserve on Colón Island
 Forestal Canglón Reserve
 Filo del Tallo Hydrological Reserve
 Metropolitan Natural Park (Parque Natural Metropolitano)
 Narganá Wilderness Area (Area Silvestre de Narganá)
 Punta Patiño Natural Reserve
 San Lorenzo Protected Area
 Serrania del Bagre Biological Corridor
 Comarca of Kuna Yala
 Chagres River
 Swamps and Wetlands of the Bay of Panamá (Manglares y Humedales de la Bahía de Panamá)
 Humedales del Golfo de Montijo
 Lago Alajuela
 Cienega de las Macanas (La Macanas Cienega)
 Parque Central
 Manglares (swamp / wetland areas)
 Palo Seco Forest Reserve (Bosque Protector de Palo Seco)
 Isla Solarte (Solarte Island, part of which is in a National Marine Park)
 Wizard Beach on Isla Bastimentos (Bastimentos Island) near Parque Nacional Marino Isla Bastimentos
 Yeguada Lagoon Forst Reserve (Reserva Forestal La Yeguada) at the Yeguada Lagoon (Laguna Yeguada)
 San San-Pond Sak Humedal Ramsar San San-Pond Sak
 Barú Volcano (Volcán Barú)
 Fortuna Forest Reserve (Reserva Forestal De Fortuna)

National parks 

National parks in Panama (List of national parks of Panama) include:

Altos de Campana National Park
Barro Colorado Island
Cerro Hoya National Park
Chagres National Park
Coiba National Park
Darién National Park
Omar Torrijos "El Cope" National Park
Chiriquí Gulf National Marine Park
Isla Bastimentos National Marine Park
La Amistad International Park
Las Cruces Trail National Park
Portobelo National Park
Sarigua National Park
Soberanía National Park
Volcan Baru National Park

References

Protected areas of Panama